Worldillia is the fourth studio album by Japanese pop-rock band Porno Graffitti. It was released on February 26, 2003. The album's title was coined by combining the word "world", which often appears in the lyrics, with sounds like "Arcadia" and "Shangri-La", meaning "Paradise" and "Utopia".

As Masami Shiratama left the band in July 2004, this was the last original album with him.

Track listing

References

2003 albums
Porno Graffitti albums
Japanese-language albums
Sony Music albums